Idwal Fisher (3 February 1935 – 5 January 2012) was a Welsh rugby union and professional rugby league footballer who played in the 1960s.

Background
Idwal Fisher's birth was registered in Swansea district, and he died aged 76 in Lochmaben, Scotland, having retired to live near his daughter in Lockerbie.

Playing career

International honours
Idwal Fisher won a cap for Wales (RL) while at Warrington in 1963.

Club career
Idwal Fisher made his début for Warrington on Saturday 24 March 1962, and he played his last match for Warrington on Saturday 14 December 1963.

Genealogical information
Idwal Fisher was the older brother of the rugby union, and rugby league footballer; Tony Fisher.

References

External links
 (archived by web.archive.org) Team – Past Players – E→F at swansearfc.co.uk
Profile at swansearfc.co.uk
 (archived by web.archive.org) Statistics at wolvesplayers.thisiswarrington.co.uk

1935 births
2012 deaths
Bradford Bulls players
Rugby league players from Swansea
Rugby league second-rows
Rugby union players from Swansea
Swansea RFC players
Wales national rugby league team players
Warrington Wolves players
Welsh rugby league players
Welsh rugby union players